Nanchari Madur is one of the villages in Thorrur mandal, and a town in Mahabubabad district of Telangana, India. It is located on Jayaprakash Narayana road between Warangal and Khammam. It is at about 50 km from Warangal and 70 km from Khammam. It is a rapidly growing town due to its location. The distance between Hyderabad to Nanchari Madur is 141 km.

Nearby mandals 
Kodakandla, Peddavangara Palakurthi, Thorrur, Wardhannapet, Maripeda, Parvathagiri, Mahabubabad,  Warangal.

Temples 
Shiva, Dhurga Maatha, Durga Matha temple, Hanuman, Katamaiah, yellama  and Bodrai Temple. Church and Mosque

References  
 villageinfo.in

Villages in Mahabubabad district